Africanus is a biannual academic journal published by UNISA Press. The journal focuses on development problems with special reference to the Third World and Southern Africa.

Abstracting and indexing
The journal is abstracted and indexed in Social Sciences Index, Ulrich's Periodical Directory, and African Urban and Regional Science Index.

External links
Online access to current articles on Sabinet

1971 establishments in South Africa
African studies journals
Biannual journals
Development studies journals
Multilingual journals
Afrikaans-language journals
English-language journals
Publications established in 1971